Chiwawa may refer to:
 Chiwawa River
 Chiwawa class oiler

See also 
 Chihuahua (disambiguation)
 Chikwawa